The following active airports serve the Sault Ste. Marie area of Ontario, Canada:

See also
 List of airports in the Bala, Ontario area
 List of airports in the Bracebridge area
 List of airports in the Fergus area
 List of airports in the London, Ontario area
 List of airports in the Ottawa area
 List of airports in the Parry Sound area
 List of airports in the Port Carling area
 List of airports in the Thunder Bay area
 List of airports in the Greater Toronto Area

References 

 
Sault Ste. Marie, Ontario
Airports
Sault Ste. Marie, Ontario
Airports